Ajax—Pickering was a provincial electoral district in central Ontario, Canada. It was first contested in the 2007 provincial election. 55.2% of the riding came from Pickering—Ajax—Uxbridge while 44.8% came from Whitby—Ajax.

The riding included all of the Town of Ajax plus that part of the City of Pickering north of Finch Avenue and east of Brock Road, as well as the area north of Highway 401 and east of Valley Farm Road.

In 2018, the district was dissolved into Pickering—Uxbridge and Ajax.

Members of Provincial Parliament

Election results

2007 electoral reform referendum

Ajax, Ontario
Former provincial electoral districts of Ontario
Pickering, Ontario